Coral cuts are a severe type of skin injury that may occur from the cuts of coral skeletons.

See also 
 Skin lesion

References 

Skin conditions resulting from physical factors